Flow chart language (FCL) is a simple imperative programming language designed for the purposes of explaining fundamental concepts of program analysis and specialization, in particular, partial evaluation. The language was first presented in 1989 by Carsten K. Gomard and Neil D. Jones. It later resurfaced in their book with Peter Sestoft in 1993, and in John Hatcliff's lecture notes in 1998. The below describes FCL as it appeared in John Hatcliff's lecture notes.

FCL is an imperative programming language close to the way a Von Neumann computer executes a program. A program is executed sequentially by following a sequence of commands, while maintaining an implicit state, i.e. the global memory. FCL has no concept of procedures, but does provide conditional and unconditional jumps. FCL lives up to its name as the abstract call-graph of an FCL program is a straightforward flow chart.

An FCL program takes as input a finite series of named values as parameters, and produces a value as a result.

Syntax

We specify the syntax of FCL using Backus–Naur form.

An FCL program is a list of formal parameter declarations, an entry label, and a sequence of basic blocks:

<p> ::= "(" <x>* ")" "(" <l> ")" <b>+

Initially, the language only allows non-negative integer variables.

A basic block consists of a label, a list of assignments, and a jump.

<b> ::= <l> ":" <a>* <j>

An assignment assigns a variable to an expression. An expression is either a constant, a variable, or application of a built-in n-ary operator:

<a> := <x> ":=" <e>
<e> := <c> | <x> | <o> "(" <e>* ")"

Note, variable names occurring throughout the program need not be declared at the top of the program. The variables declared at the top of the program designate arguments to the program.

As values can only be non-negative integers, so can constants. The list of operations in general is irrelevant, so long as they have no side effects, which includes exceptions, e.g. division by 0:

<c> ::= "0" | "1" | "2" | ...
<o> ::= "+" | "-" | "*" | "=" | "<" | ">" | ...

Example

We write a program that computes the nth Fibonacci number, for n>2:

(n)
(init)

init: x1 = 1
      x2 = 1

fib:  x1 = x1 + x2

      t = x1
      x1 = x2
      x2 = t

      n = -(n 1)

      if >(n 2) then fib else exit

exit: return x2

We can check the correctness of the method for n=4 by presenting the execution trace of the program:

Where  marks a final state of the program, with the return value .

References

Programming languages
Programming paradigms